The Saigon Trade Center is a high-rise building in Ho Chi Minh City, Vietnam. It was constructed from April 1994 and completed in July 1997 and with a height of 145 metres (476 ft), it was the tallest building in Vietnam from 1997 until 2010, when it was surpassed by the Bitexco Financial Tower.

The building has 33 floors with a total floor area of over 54,000 square meters. There are 10 elevators used for customers, 2 elevators used for service purpose only. The building has three antennas, which make the total height of the building increase to 160 meters. On the roof of the building, there is a coffee shop called "Panorama", visitors can see the city view and skyline from their seat.

Saigon Trade Center is built by reinforced concrete and glass cladding for exterior.

Floor plan

References

Skyscrapers in Ho Chi Minh City
Skyscraper office buildings in Vietnam
Commercial buildings completed in 1997
Office buildings completed in 1997